Type 16 may refer to:
Peugeot Type 16, an early Peugeot model built from 1897 to 1900
Type 16 frigate, a class of British anti-submarine frigates of the Royal Navy
Bristol Type 16, a British two-seat biplane fighter and reconnaissance aircraft
Type 16 Maneuver Combat Vehicle, a Japanese wheeled tank destroyer